Maria of Montferrat (1192–1212) was the queen of Jerusalem from 1205 until her death. Her parents were Isabella I and her second husband, Conrad of Montferrat. Maria succeeded her mother under the regency of her half-uncle John of Ibelin. After him the kingdom was ruled on Maria's behalf by her husband, John of Brienne, whom she married in 1210. She died giving birth to her successor, Isabella II.

Childhood
Maria was born in 1192 in Tyre to Queen Isabella I of Jerusalem. She was named after her maternal grandmother, Maria Komnene. Maria's father was Isabella's second husband, Marquis Conrad of Montferrat, and Maria was known as La Marquise after him. Conrad was assassinated on 28 April 1192. Isabella was pregnant at the time, but Maria may have been born before her father's death.

Within a week of Conrad's death, Isabella married Count Henry II of Champagne, who had had some misgivings because Isabella might be succeeded by Conrad's child. Henry wanted to be on good terms with Aimery of Cyprus. Maria, his stepdaughter, and Alice and Philippa, his daughters with Isabella, were therefore betrothed to Aimery's sons Guy, John, and Hugh, but Guy and John died young and only Alice's betrothal to Hugh materialized into a marriage. Henry fell from a window to his death on 10 September 1197. Maria's next stepfather was King Aimery. The surviving children of this marriage, Queen Isabella's final, were two daughters, Sibylla and Melisende, and so Maria remained her mother's heir presumptive.

Reign
Queen Isabella I died shortly after King Aimery in April 1205, two months after the death of their infant son. Five daughters survived Isabella and the eldest of them, 13-year-old Maria, succeeded to the throne of Jerusalem, while the crown of Cyprus passed to Maria's stepbrother Hugh I. John of Ibelin was made regent; he was the half-brother of Isabella, who may have nominated him on her deathbed, and held the Lordship of Beirut, the richest fief in the Kingdom of Jerusalem. John ruled peacefully on Maria's behalf for three years.

A search for a husband began in 1208. The plan to have the queen marry King Peter II of Aragon failed. King Philip II of France was visited by the bishop of Acre, Florent, and the lord of Caesarea, Aymar de Lairon, who asked him to find a capable candidate. The task proved difficult, and only in 1210 the king declared the search successful; an impoverished and aged knight, John of Brienne, had accepted. John arrived in Acre, the capital of the kingdom due to the fall of Jerusalem to the Muslims in 1187, on 13 September 1210. The Latin patriarch of Jerusalem, Albert of Vercelli, pronounced Maria and John married the next day. Their coronation was held in the Cathedral of Tyre on 3 October.

Queen Maria died after giving birth to a daughter, Isabella II, in 1212. Though John had been a prudent king during their marriage, Maria's death cast doubt on his future role. Isabella inherited Maria's kingdom, while John continued to rule it on the infant's behalf. Maria's line became extinct in 1268 with the death of her great-grandson Conrad III, and the kingdom passed to the descendants of her sister Alice.

References

Sources
 
 

1192 births
1212 deaths
13th-century kings of Jerusalem
13th-century women rulers
Queens regnant of Jerusalem
13th-century Italian women
Medieval child monarchs
Aleramici
Deaths in childbirth